Ibn Ḥajar al-ʿAsqalānī or Ibn Ḥajar (full name: Shihābud-Dīn Abul-Faḍl Aḥmad ibn Nūrud-Dīn ʿAlī ibn Muḥammad ibn Ḥajar al-ʿAsqalānī al-Kināni) (18 February 1372 – 2 February 1449 CE / 773 – 852 A.H.), was a classic Islamic scholar "whose life work constitutes the final summation of the science of Hadith." He authored some 150 works on hadith, history, biography, tafsir, poetry, and Shafi'i jurisprudence, the most valued of which being his commentary of Sahih al-Bukhari, titled Fath al-Bari.

Early life
He was born in Cairo in 1372, the son of the Shafi'i scholar and poet Nur ad-Din 'Ali. His parents had moved from Alexandria, originally hailing from Ashkelon. Both of his parents died in his infancy, and he and his sister, Sitt ar-Rakb, became wards of his father's first wife's brother, Zaki ad-Din al-Kharrubi, who enrolled Ibn Hajar in Qur'anic studies when he was five years old. Here he excelled, learning Surah Maryam in a single day and memorising the entire Qur'an by the age of 9. He progressed to the memorization of texts such as the abridged version of Ibn al-Hajib's work on the foundations of fiqh.

Education
When he accompanied al-Kharrubi to Mecca at the age of 12, he was considered competent to lead the Tarawih prayers during Ramadan. When his guardian died in 1386, Ibn Hajar's education in Egypt was entrusted to hadith scholar Shams ad-Din ibn al-Qattan, who entered him in the courses given by Sirajud-Din al-Bulqini (d. 1404) and Siraj al-Din al-Mulaqqin (d. 1402) in Shafi'i fiqh, and Zain al-Din al-'Iraqi (d. 1404) in hadith, after which he travelled to Damascus and Jerusalem, to study under Shamsud-Din al-Qalqashandi (d. 1407), Badr al-Din al-Balisi (d. 1401), and Fatima bint al-Manja at-Tanukhiyya (d. 1401). After a further visit to Mecca, Medina, and Yemen, he returned to Egypt. Al-Suyuti said: "It is said that he drank Zamzam water in order to reach the level of adh-Dhahabi in memorization—which he succeeded in doing, even surpassing him."

Personal life
In 1397, at the age of twenty-five, Al-'Asqalani married the celebrated hadith expert Uns Khatun, who held ijazat from 'Abdur-Rahim al-'Iraqi and gave public lectures to crowds of 'ulama', including as-Sakhawi.

Positions
Ibn Hajar went on to be appointed to the position of Egyptian chief-judge (Qadi) several times.

Death
Ibn Hajar died after 'Isha' (night prayer) on 8th Dhul-Hijjah 852 (2 February 1449), aged 79. An estimated 50,000 people attended his funeral in Cairo, including Sultan Sayfud-Din Jaqmaq (1373–1453 CE) and Caliph of Cairo Al-Mustakfi II ( CE).

Works
Ibn Hajar wrote approximately 150 works on hadith, hadith terminology, biographical evaluation, history, tafsir, poetry and Shafi'i jurisprudence.

Fath al-Bari – ibn Hajar's commentary of Sahih al-Bukhari's Jamiʿ al-Sahih (817/1414), completed an unfinished work begun by ibn Rajab in the 1390s. It became the most celebrated and highly regarded work on the author. Celebrations near Cairo on its publication (Rajab 842 AH / December 1428 CE) were described by historian Muhammad ibn Iyas (d.930 AH), as "the greatest of the age". Many of Egypt's leading dignitaries were among the crowds, ibn Hajar himself gave readings, poets gave eulogies and gold was distributed.
al-Isaba fi tamyiz al-Sahaba – the most comprehensive dictionary of the Companions of the Prophet.
 Merits of the Plague (a discussion of the Black Death and meditations on illness and the Divine, which contains excerpts from Fatḥ al-Bārī
al-Durar al-Kāminah – a biographical dictionary of leading figures of the eighth century.
al-Kamal fi Asma' al-Rijal – an abbreviation of Tahdhib al-Kamal, the encyclopedia of hadith narrators by Jamal al-Din al-Mizzi
Taqrib al-Tahdhib – the abridgement of Tahthib al-Tahthib.
Ta'jil al-Manfa'ah – biographies of the narrators of the Musnads of the four Imams, not found in at-Tahthib.
Bulugh al-Maram – on hadith used in Shafi'i fiqh.
Nata'ij al-Afkar fi Takhrij Ahadith al-Adhkar
Lisan al-Mizan – a reworking of Mizan al-'Itidal by al-Dhahabi, which in turn is a reworking of an earlier work.
Talkhis al-Habir fi Takhrij al-Rafiʿi al-Kabir
al-Diraya fi Takhrij Ahadith al-Hidaya
Taghliq al-Taʿliq ʿala Sahih al-Bukhari
Risala Tadhkirat al-Athar
al-Matalib al-ʿAliya bi Zawa'id al-Masanid al-Thamaniya
Nukhbat al-Fikar along with his explanation of it entitled Nuzhah al-Nathr in hadith terminology
al-Nukat ala Kitab ibn al-Salah – commentary of the Muqaddimah of ibn al-Salah
al-Qawl al-Musaddad fi Musnad Ahmad a discussion of hadith of disputed authenticity in the Musnad of Ahmad
Silsilat al-Dhahab
Taʿrif Ahl al-Taqdis bi Maratib al-Mawsufin bi al-Tadlis
Raf' al-isr 'an qudat Misr – a biographical dictionary of Egyptian judges. Partial French translation in Mathieu Tillier, Vie des cadis de Misr. Cairo: Institut français d'archéologie orientale, 2002.

See also 
 List of Ash'aris and Maturidis
 Nur al-Din Ali ibn Da'ud al-Jawhari al-Sayrafi, a student of his

References

External links

 Biodata at MuslimScholars.info
Ibn Hajar al-‘Asqalani and his Commentary
Books by Ibn Hajar Al-Asqalani

1372 births
1449 deaths
14th-century Arabs
15th-century Arabs
Asharis
Shafi'is
Hadith scholars
Shaykh al-Islāms
Sunni Muslim scholars of Islam
Sunni imams
Shafi'i fiqh scholars
14th-century Egyptian judges
Egyptian imams
Scholars from the Mamluk Sultanate
15th-century Egyptian judges
15th-century writers
Biographical evaluation scholars
Critics of Ibn Arabi